Enoch Cree Nation 135, previously known as Stony Plain No. 135, is an Indian reserve of the Enoch Cree Nation #440 in Alberta. It is adjacent to the City of Edmonton to the east and Parkland County to the north, west, and south.

Geography 
The locality of Enoch is on the Enoch Cree Nation 135 reserve.

Demographics 

In 2016 Enoch Cree Nation 135 had a population of 1,690 living in 576 dwellings, a 71.2% increase from 2011.

According to the Canada 2016 Census:
Population: 1,690
% Change (2011-2016): +71.2%
Dwellings: 576
Area (km2): 51.55
Density (persons per km2): 32.8

See also 
List of communities in Alberta
List of Indian reserves in Alberta
Tsuut'ina 145, a reserve similarly adjacent to the City of Calgary

References 

Edmonton Metropolitan Region
Indian reserves in Alberta
Cree reserves and territories
Parkland County